The 2019–20 season was Abha's first season back in the Pro League after winning the MS League the previous. This was be their 3rd non-consecutive season in the Pro League and their 54th season in existence. The club participated in the Pro League and the King Cup.

The season ran from 1 July 2019 to September 2020.

Players

Squad information

Out on loan

Transfers and loans

Transfers in

Loans in

Transfers out

Loans out

Pre-season and friendlies

Competitions

Overview

Saudi Professional League

League table

Results summary

Result round by round

Matches
The Professional League schedule was announced on 21 July 2019.

King Cup

Statistics

Appearances

Last updated on 9 September 2020.

|-
! colspan=10 style=background:#dcdcdc; text-align:center|Goalkeepers

|-
! colspan=10 style=background:#dcdcdc; text-align:center|Defenders

|-
! colspan=10 style=background:#dcdcdc; text-align:center|Midfielders

|-
! colspan=10 style=background:#dcdcdc; text-align:center|Forwards

|-
! colspan=18 style=background:#dcdcdc; text-align:center| Players sent out on loan this season

|-
! colspan=18 style=background:#dcdcdc; text-align:center| Player who made an appearance this season but have left the club

|}

Goalscorers

Last Updated: 9 September 2020

Clean sheets

Last Updated: 11 March 2020

References

External links

Abha Club seasons
Abha